Rubis is the French word for ruby.

Rubis may refer to:

 French ship Rubis, various ships of the French Navy 
 Rubis-class submarine, a French Navy nuclear attack submarine class
 Rubis (rocket), a French two-stage rocket
 Scintex Rubis, a French 1960s aircraft
 Rubis (company), a French-based storage and distribution company

See also
 Rubes, a syndicated newspaper cartoon
 Rubes (surname), a list of people
 Riverside Rubes, a minor league baseball team (1941, 1947-1950)
 Providence Rubes, a baseball team in 1926